Type V Blood is a Russian Industrial/EBM band from Kaliningrad. Band formed in 1999 and recorded two albums. But after that Type V Blood was disbanded. In 2008 band was reformed and continued to move forward. September, 8th of 2015 band released their new EP called Seven Scars through independent belarusian music label Venator Music.

Discography 
Dead Generation 77 (Red'n'Black, 2001)
V.E.G.A. World Top 8 (Red'n'Black, 2004)
Astra (Molot Records, 2009)
Warld (Hadahardz Music, 2011)
Penta (Artificial Sun, 2012)
Seven Scars EP (Venator Music, 2015)

Appearances 
Tribute to Nirvana Nevermind (БК, 2011)
Digital Meat vol.1 (Digital Meat Prod., 2012)
Voices Of The Machines (Artificial Sun, 2012)

See also
 Industrial music
 Electronic body music

References

External links 
 Official Facebook page
 Official VK page
 Type V Blood at Discogs

Russian electronic music groups
Electronic body music groups
Musical groups established in 1999
Russian industrial music groups
1999 establishments in Russia